"Arizona" is a song written by Kenny Young and recorded in 1969 by Mark Lindsay, a solo effort while still lead singer for Paul Revere and the Raiders. Lindsay was backed by L.A. session musicians from the Wrecking Crew. The single peaked at number 10 on the Billboard Hot 100 chart on 14 February 1970 and was awarded a RlAA Gold Disc in April 1970. A version by the British band The Family Dogg was also released in 1969.

Overview
The song's title, "Arizona", refers to the singer's girlfriend, whom he considers innocent and naïve.  The singer wistfully describes Arizona's idealism and lifestyle, which he considers absurd and immature ("you're acting like a teeny bopper runaway child").  He then urges Arizona to discard her hippie trappings, including "hobo shoes", "rainbow shades", and "Indian braids", and view the world through more realistic eyes.  However, even as he exhorts Arizona to become more worldly, the singer continues to praise her, describing Arizona as "a little-town saint".  In the end, his love for Arizona and what she represents to him overcomes his cynicism, and the singer decides to follow her example, adopting her view of the world, instead of expecting her to accept his.

Chart performance

Weekly charts

Year-end charts

References

External links
 Lyrics of this song from Metrolyrics
 

1969 singles
1970 singles
Mark Lindsay songs
Songs written by Kenny Young
Columbia Records singles
1969 songs